Garden Ridge is a city in Comal County, Texas, United States, incorporated in 1972. The population was 4,186 at the 2020 census, up from 3,259 at the 2010 census. It is part of the San Antonio metropolitan statistical rea.

Geography
It is bordered to the south by the city of Schertz.

Demographics

As of the 2020 United States census, 4,186 people, 1,519 households, and 1,344 families were residing in the city.

As of the census of 2000, 1,882 people, 704 households, and 622 families were residing in the city. The population density was 238.9 people per sq mi (92.2/km2). The 722 housing units had an average density of 91.7/sq mi (35.4/km2). The racial makeup of the city was 93.84% White, 2.23% African American, 0.11% Native American, 1.12% Asian, 0.11% Pacific Islander, 1.43% from other races, and 1.17% from two or more races. Hispanics or Latinos of any race were 7.55% of the population.

As of the census of 2010, 3,259 people were living in Garden Ridge.

Of th 704 households, 29.7% had children under 18 living with them, 83.7% were married couples living together, 3.8% had a female householder with no husband present, and 11.6% were not families. About 9.2% of all households were made up of individuals, and 4.7% had someone living alone who was 65 or older. The average household size was 2.67, and the average family size was 2.85.

In the city, the age distribution was 22.5% under 18, 4.1% from 18 to 24, 18.3% from 25 to 44, 40.1% from 45 to 64, and 14.9% who were 65 or older. The median age was 47 years. For every 100 females, there were 100.9 males. For every 100 females aged 18 and over, there were 96.0 males.

The median income for a household in the city was $90,184, and for a family was $92,269. Males had a median income of $68,750 versus $37,708 for females. The per capita income for the city was $40,201. About 1.6% of families and 1.8% of the population were below the poverty line, including 1.3% of those under age 18 and 4.0% of those age 65 or over.

Education
Garden Ridge is served by the Comal Independent School District (CISD).

Students of the CISD living in Garden Ridge attend Garden Ridge Elementary School, Danville Middle School, Davenport High School, and Canyon High School.

The elementary school is across from the Garden Ridge municipal complex.

References

External links
 City of Garden Ridge official website
 

Cities in Comal County, Texas
Cities in Texas
Greater San Antonio